Robert James Byron, 13th Baron Byron (born 5 April 1950), is a British nobleman, peer, politician, and barrister. He is a descendant of a cousin of Romantic poet and writer George Gordon Byron, 6th Baron Byron.

Early life and education
Byron is the son of Lt. Col. Richard Geoffrey Gordon Byron, 12th Baron Byron, and Dorigen Margaret Esdaile. He was educated at Wellington College in Berkshire and studied law at Trinity College, Cambridge.

He married Robyn Margaret McLean in 1979. She became Lady Byron when her husband inherited the barony on 15 June 1989. The couple have four children:
 The Hon. Caroline Anne Victoria Byron (1981)
 The Hon. Emily Clare Byron (1984)
 The Hon. Sophie Georgina Byron (1986)
 The Hon. Charles Richard Gordon Byron (28 July 1990); heir apparent.

Professional life
Byron was admitted to the Inner Temple in 1974 and thus became entitled to practice as a barrister. He eventually became a partner at Holman, Fenwick & Willan, and a President of the British Byron Society.

House of Lords
Upon inheriting his title, Byron became entitled to sit in the House of Lords, where he took the Oath of Allegiance in October 1989. He attended chamber debates infrequently, speaking mostly on bills related to the justice system and shipping law. Along with most hereditary peers, he lost the right to attend when the House of Lords Act 1999 took effect in November 1999.

Arms

Personal life 
Byron is resident in the New Forest, Hampshire, and in 2021 had published a novel called Echoes of a Life.

References

1950 births
Living people
20th-century British lawyers
21st-century British lawyers
Robert
Members of the Inner Temple
People educated at Wellington College, Berkshire
Alumni of Trinity College, Cambridge
Barons Byron
Byron